3:33 is the second studio album by Zug Izland, released on June 1, 2004.

Music style
Allmusic reviewer Johnny Loftus describes Zug Izland's music style as incorporating elements of piano ballads, goth, industrial and electronic music, nu metal and horror film scores. According to Loftus, "Zug Izland's sparer style [is] unique in an alt-metal climate of two-guitar lineups and monstrous six-string bass bottom ends."

Reception
3:33 peaked at #26 on the Billboard Top Heatseekers chart and at #22 on the Top Independent Albums chart. In his review of the album, Allmusic's Johnny Loftus wrote that "like their mentors in ICP, Zug Izland are very earnest in what they do. Problem is, 3:33 sounds like the result of whatever hundred ideas stuck to their practice space wall [...] their sonics aren't strong enough to raise 3:33's alert level past blue."

Track listing

Personnel
Information taken from Allmusic.

Musicians
Syn — vocals 
Mike Puwal — bass, guitar, keyboards 
Guido Mullingan — bass, background vocals
Glen Chorazyczewski — background vocals
Chris Codish — piano 
Michelle Czygan — piano 
Vinnie Dombrowski — background vocals
Esham — vocals 
Jessica Heit — violin 
Ashley Horak — arranger, drums 
Pat Kepler — background vocals
Lynx Mona — choir, chorus 
Mickey P. — drums
Courtney Patrick — background vocals
Joy Sparks — choir, chorus 
Doug Woern — bass

Additional personnel
Mickey P. — drums, producer, engineer, mixing 
Bob Alford — photography 
Tom Baker — mastering 
Brother Al — mixing
Michael Scotta	— artwork

References

2004 albums
Psychopathic Records albums
Zug Izland albums